Vakinuvaan Bunefaa Vaudheh Nuvanhey? is a 2009 Maldivian romantic television drama series directed by Hassan Haleem. Produced by Ilyas Faruhad, it stars Ahmed Latheef, Fathimath Azifa, Ibrahim Jihad, Aminath Ameela and Mariyam Shahuza in main roles. The series follows the feud of a family over two outsiders.

Cast

Main
 Ahmed Latheef as Moosa
 Fathimath Azifa as Reema
 Ibrahim Jihad as Nabeel
 Aminath Ameela as Fazna
 Mariyam Shahuza as Shifaza
 Haseena Mohamed as Faheema

Recurring
 Shaheem as Hassandhee; Reema's father
 Yooshau Jameel as Ashraf; Reema's husband

Episodes

Soundtrack

Release and reception
The first episode of the series was aired on 1 July 209 on the occasion of first anniversary of DhiTV. The series mainly received mixed to negative reviews from critics, for its dragged and melodramatic screenplay and weak acting.

References

Serial drama television series
Maldivian television shows